Progress 1 (Russian: Прогресс 1), was a Soviet unmanned Progress cargo spacecraft which was launched in 1978 to resupply the Salyut 6 space station. It was the maiden flight of the Progress spacecraft, and used the Progress 7K-TG configuration. It carried supplies for the EO-1 crew aboard Salyut 6, which consisted of Soviet cosmonauts Yuri Romanenko and Georgy Grechko. The cargo carried by Progress 1 also included equipment for conducting scientific research, and fuel for adjusting the station's orbit and performing manoeuvres.

Spacecraft 

Progress 1 was a Progress 7K-TG spacecraft. The first of forty three to be launched, it had the serial number 102. The Progress 7K-TG spacecraft was the first generation Progress, derived from the Soyuz 7K-T and intended for unmanned logistics missions to space stations in support of the Salyut programme. The spacecraft were also used on some missions to adjust the orbit of the space station.

The spacecraft were powered by chemical batteries, and could operate in free flight for up to three days, remaining docked to the station for up to thirty.

Launch and docking 
Progress 1 was launched at 08:24:40 UTC on 20 January 1978, atop a Soyuz-U 11A511U carrier rocket flying from Site 31/6 at the Baikonur Cosmodrome, USSR. The rocket that launched it had the serial number E15000-075. Following launch, Progress 1 was given the COSPAR designation 1978-008A, whilst NORAD assigned it the Satellite Catalog Number 10603.

Following launch, Progress 1 began two days of free flight. It subsequently docked with the aft port of the Salyut 6 space station at 10:12:14 UTC on 22 January 1978. When the Progress spacecraft docked, the station's other docking port was occupied by the Soyuz 27 spacecraft.

Mission 
Progress 1 was the first of twelve Progress spacecraft used to supply the Salyut 6 space station between 1978 and 1981. Whilst Progress 1 was docked, the EO-1 crew, consisting of cosmonauts Yuri Romanenko and Georgi Grechko, was aboard the station. Progress 1 demonstrated the capability to refuel a spacecraft on orbit, critical for long-term station operations. Once the cosmonauts had unloaded the cargo delivered by Progress 1, they loaded refuse onto the freighter for disposal.

Progress 1 undocked from Salyut 6 at 05:54 UTC on 6 February. It remained in orbit for two more days, finally being deorbited to a destructive reentry over the Pacific Ocean at around 02:45 UTC on 8 February 1978.

See also 

 1978 in spaceflight
 List of Progress missions
 List of uncrewed spaceflights to Salyut space stations

References 

1978 in the Soviet Union
Progress (spacecraft) missions
Spacecraft launched in 1978
Spacecraft which reentered in 1978
Spacecraft launched by Soyuz-U rockets